Westchester Valley  is a small community in the Canadian province of Nova Scotia, located in Cumberland County.

References
Westchester Valley on Destination Nova Scotia

Communities in Cumberland County, Nova Scotia
General Service Areas in Nova Scotia